Big Heart Christian School (BHCS) is a Christian school in the Bojeong District of Yongin City near Seoul, South Korea.

This school teaches in a Christian focused learning environment based around the American curriculum. The school is an English immersion school and a member of Association of Christian Schools International (ACSI). The school aims to "build Christian leaders to change the world".

There are about 140 students from grades 1 to 12 and approximately 20 faculty members.

School background
For over ten years, Hanmaum Church sponsored a kindergarten program. This foundation served as a reference point for the ministry of Big Heart Christian School. In January 2005, with six students, the school began. The following September, the first full year of school began with 13 students.

Faculty
 School founder and chairman: Pastor Houng Lyul Kim

References

External links
 BHCS web site

Christian schools in South Korea
Educational institutions established in 2005
2005 establishments in South Korea